Security: A New Framework for Analysis is a book by Barry Buzan, Ole Wæver and Jaap de Wilde. It is considered to be the leading text outlining the views of the Copenhagen School of Security Studies. The work addresses two important conceptual developments: Buzan's notion of sectoral analysis and Ole Wæver's concept of 'securitization'. The book argues for an intersubjective understanding of security and that our understanding of security should be widened to include issues such as environmental security and threats to identity (societal security).

Authors of this book come up with constructive ideas about international security, culture, economics.

This book contains 9 chapters:

 Introduction
 Security Analysis: Conceptual Apparatus
 The Military Sector
 The Environmental Sector
 The Economic Sector
 The Societal Sector
 The Political Sector
 How Sectors Are Synthesized
 Conclusions

Further reading
 Hansen, Lene (2000) 'The Little Mermaid's Silent Security Dilemma and the Absence of Gender in the Copenhagen School', Millennium - Journal of International Studies, 29: 285-306
 

Security studies
Copenhagen School (security studies)
1997 non-fiction books
Collaborative non-fiction books